Esperándote (English title: Waiting for you) is a Mexican telenovela produced by Eugenio Cobo for Televisa in 1985.

Rebeca Rambal and José Elías Moreno starred as protagonists, while Nayelli Saldívar starred as child protagonist.

Plot 
Margarita and Pablo are a young couple living on a farm on the outskirts of Taxco. Your marriage is in crisis, because both want a child but can not have children Margarita. As the crisis is leading the brink of divorce, decide to adopt a child. So María Inés comes into their lives.

Gusanito as he is fondly called, is a sweet, tender and intelligent orphan girl who finally feel the joy of knowing what a real home. However, Margarita at first the scorn because she is not his biological daughter but only an adopted. Still, Gusanito the love of Pablo and everyone wins at the farm, as Celso and Juancho pawns.

With great enthusiasm is dedicated to help in any way i can, and start attending school, and Margarita will go realizing how much better the girl and the daughter who always waited, and grow to love as their own.

Cast 
Rebeca Rambal as Margarita Moreno
José Elías Moreno as Pablo Moreno
Nayelli Saldívar as María Inés Moreno "Gusanito"/María Inés Noriega
Jaime Lozano as Celso
Salvador Sánchez as Juancho
Diana Bracho as Isabel
Antonio Medellín as Federico Noriega
Patricia Reyes Spíndola as Refugio
Elizabeth Duperón as Irene 
Alonso Echánove as Eduardo
Lucero Lander as Martha
Gibránn as Francisco
Patricia Panini as Ángela
Carmen Rodríguez as Adriana
Mariana Gaja as Anita
César Adrián Sánchez as Alfonsito
Lili Inclán as Anciana
Enrique Gilabert as Father Simón
Ligia Escalante as Sra. Miranda
Laura Morty as Sra. Martínez
Eduardo Castell as Sacristán
Eugenio Cobo as Dr. Millán
Humberto Vélez as Sr. Martínez

Soundtrack 
Side A                 
 Gusanito                 
 Margarita                
 Isabel                   
 Gusanito alegre          
 Pablo                    
 Martha bossa nova        
 Refugio                  
 Eduardo                  
 Gusanito piano

Side B
 Isabel lánguida
 Irene
 Isabel romántica
 Gusanito triste
 Margarita bossa nova
 Federico
 Margarita triste
 Juancho

Awards

References

External links

Mexican telenovelas
1985 telenovelas
1985 Mexican television series debuts
1986 Mexican television series endings
Spanish-language telenovelas
Television shows set in Mexico
Televisa telenovelas